Nikolai Onufrievich Sukhozanet (1794 – 22 July 1871) was an Imperial Russian Army general and statesman.

Nikolai Sukhozanet was born in a noble family of Vitebsk guberniya. During the Napoleon's invasion of Russia he bravely fought in numerous battles and finished the campaign in Paris in the rank of lieutenant of artillery. His awards included Order of St. Vladimir of 4th degree and Order of St. Anna of 2nd degree.

After the war he occupied different positions in the 1st Army and in 1824 was promoted to Major General. When the November Uprising began he led the Staff of artillery in the acting army. He distinguished himself in the Battle of Ostrołęka and received the Order of St. George of 3rd degree. From 1836 to 1849 he commanded the 4th artillery division. From 1849 until the Battle of Chernaya River of Crimean War he commanded the artillery of the acting army, after that Sukhozanet got the 3rd Corps and the Southern Army the next year.

On 17 April 1856 he became the Minister of Land Forces. Emperor Alexander II has put him two main tasks: the reduction of army's expenses and the deep reform of the army. The first task was solved but the second was completely abandoned by Sukhozanet.

During his minister's term he two times acted as a Namestnik of Kingdom of Poland – first time during the illness of Prince Mikhail Gorchakov and second after resign of Karl Lambert. Because of bad health he left on 6 October 1861 the army and on 9 November resigns his post of minister.

References
 

1794 births
1871 deaths
Imperial Russian Army generals
Members of the State Council (Russian Empire)
Russian people of the November Uprising
Recipients of the Order of St. George of the Third Degree
Belarusian nobility